Bleach is a chemical that removes color or whitens.

Bleach or Bleaching may also refer to:

Music
Bleach (American band), an American Christian rock group
Bleach (American band Bleach album), 1999
Bleach (British band), a British shoegazing group active in the early 1990s
Bleach (Japanese band), a Japanese all-girl punk group, known as Bleach03 in North America
Bleach (Nirvana album), a 1989 album by Nirvana
"Bleach", a song by Easyworld from This Is Where I Stand
“Bleach” a song by 5 Seconds Of Summer from 5SOS5
"Bleach", a song by Brockhampton from Saturation III
Bleached, an American pop band
Bleech, British alternative rock band founded 2009

Processes or techniques
Anal bleaching
Rhodopsin bleaching, as part of the visual cycle
Bleaching of wood pulp, whitening and lignin removal from wood pulp
Coral bleaching, a pathological response of coral to environmental stresses
Textile bleaching
Skin whitening
Tooth bleaching
Photobleaching

Other
Bleach (manga), a Japanese manga series
Bleach (TV series), the animated adaptation of the manga
Bleach (2018 film), a live-action film based on the manga
Bleach (1998 film), a 1998 science-fiction short film
Bleach, a 2002 film starring Adam Scott

See also